The Lagos Yacht Club (LYC) is one of the oldest sporting club in Nigeria. The yacht club was founded in 1932. It is located south of Tafawa Balewa Square and the National Museum; all in Lagos Island, across the bridge leading to Victoria Island. Facilities at the harbour also include several sailing boats and other sport activities which take place at the club house.

The club was founded by expatriate sailing lovers in Lagos, among whom were C.J. Webb, Jessie Horne, R.M. Williams and H.A. Whittaker. A regatta held in 1931 to coincide with the visit of H.M.S. Cardiff and the German cruiser Emden generated interest in sailing. At inception, the club had over 20 members.

Recurring Events
The Lagos Club hosts the annual Whispering Palms regatta.

See also
Lagos Lawn Tennis Club

References

External links

Yacht clubs in Nigeria 
Sports clubs in Lagos
1932 establishments in Nigeria
Sports clubs established in 1932